Smith Knob is a partly snow-covered rock peak, or knob, standing one nautical mile (1.9 km) south-southeast of Mendenhall Peak in the east part of the Thiel Mountains of Antarctica. The name was proposed by Peter Bermel and Arthur Ford, co-leaders of the United States Geological Survey (USGS) Thiel Mountains party which surveyed these mountains, 1960–61. Named for George Otis Smith, fourth director of the U.S. Geological Survey, 1907–30.

Hills of Ellsworth Land